Women composers of Western classical music are disproportionately absent from music textbooks and concert programs that constitute the Western canon, even though many women have composed music.

The reasons for women's absence are various. The musicologist Marcia Citron writing in 1990 noted that many works of musical history and anthologies of music had very few, or sometimes no, references to and examples of music written by women. Among the reasons for historical under-representation of women composers Citron has adduced problems of access to musical education and to the male hierarchy of the musical establishment (performers, conductors, impresarios etc.); condescending attitudes of male reviewers, and their association of women composers with "salon music" rather than music of the concert platform; and denial of female creativity in the arts by philosophers such as Jean-Jacques Rousseau and Immanuel Kant. All this needs to be considered in the perspective of restrictions against women's advancement in cultural, economic and political spheres over a long historical period.

Such discrimination against women composers can be considered in the context of general societal attitudes about gender or perceived roles of men and women, many musicologists and critics have come to incorporate gender studies in assessing the history and practice of the art.

Some notable Western composers include: Hildegard von Bingen (1098–1179), a German Benedictine abbess, writer, composer, philosopher, Christian mystic, visionary, and polymath; Fanny Mendelssohn (1805–1847); Clara Schumann (1819–1896); Ethel Smyth (1858–1944); Amy Beach (1867–1944); Rebecca Clarke (1886–1979); Germaine Tailleferre (1892–1983); Lili Boulanger (1893–1918); Sofia Gubaidulina (1931–); and Kaija Saariaho (1952–).

Women composers are also listed alphabetically at List of women composers by name.

Before 16th century

 Hildegard of Bingen (1098–1179)
 Herrad of Landsberg (c. 1130–1195)
 Azalais de Porcairagues ( mid-12th century)
 Iseut de Capio (c. 1140–?)
 Tibors de Sarenom (fl. mid-12th century)
 Marie de France (1175?–1225?)
 Alamanda de Castelnau (fl. second half of 12th century)
 Maria de Ventadorn (fl. late 12th century)
 Beatritz de Dia (fl. late 12th/early 13th centuries)
 Blanche of Castile (1188–1252)
 Castelloza (fl. early 13th century)
 Dame Margot (fl. 13th century)
 Gertrude of Dagsburg (fl. 13th century)
 Maroie de Dregnau de Lille (fl. 13th century)
 Dame Maroie (fl. 13th century)
 Sainte des Prez (fl. 13th century)
 Lorete (fl. 13th century)
 Garsenda de Proensa (fl. early 13th century)
 Birgitta of Sweden (c. 1303 – c. 1373)

16th century

 Gaspara Stampa (1523–1554)
 Maddalena Casulana (c. 1540 – c. 1590)
 Paola Massarenghi (fl. 1565–1585)
 Lucia Quinciani (born c. 1566, fl. 1611)
 Claudia Sessa (c. 1570 – between 1613 and 1619)
 Cesarina Ricci de Tingoli (born c. 1573, fl. 1597)
 Vittoria Aleotti (c.1575–after 1620)
 Sulpitia Cesis (1577–after 1619)
 Adriana Basile (c. 1580 – c. 1640)
 Francesca Caccini (1587–1640?)
 Caterina Assandra (c. 1590–after 1618)
 Alba Trissina (c. 1590–after 1638)
 Lucrezia Orsina Vizzana (1590–1662)
 Settimia Caccini (1591–1638?)
 Claudia Rusca (1593–1676)
 Clementine de Bourges (unknown date – 1562)

17th century

 Chiara Margarita Cozzolani (1602–1678)
 Leonora Duarte (1610–1678)
 Leonora Baroni (1611–1670)
 Sophie Elisabeth, Duchess of Brunswick-Lüneburg (1613–1676)
 Francesca Campana (c. 1615–1665)
 Barbara Strozzi (1619–1677)
 Isabella Leonarda (1620–1704)
 Mlle Bocquet (early 17th century–after 1660)
 Lady Mary Dering (1629–1704)
 Maria Francesca Nascinbeni (c. 1640–1680)
 Esther Elizabeth Velkiers (1640–after 1685)
 Amalia Catharina (1640–1697)
 Antonia Bembo (c. 1640–c. 1720)
 Maria Cattarina Calegari (1644–1675)
 Marieta Morosina Priuli (fl. 1665)
 Mme Sicard (fl.1678)
 Rosa Giacinta Badalla (1660–1710)
 Angiola Teresa Moratori Scanabecchi (1662–1708)
 Élisabeth Jacquet de La Guerre (1665–1729)
 Françoise-Charlotte de Senneterre Ménétou (1679–1745)
 Maria Anna de Raschenau (fl. 1690s–1703)
 Michielina della Pietà (fl. c. 1701–1744)
 Caterina Benedicta Grazianini (fl. 1705–15 [b.ca.1685])
 Camilla de Rossi (fl. 1707–1710)
 Julie Pinel (fl. 1710–1737)
 Maria Margherita Grimani (fl. 1713–1718 [b.ca.1690])
 Mrs Philarmonica (fl. 1715)
 Marie-Anne-Catherine Quinault (1695–1791)

1701–1750

 Rosanna Scalfi Marcello (1704 or 1705–after 1742)
 Zanetta Farussi (1707–1776)
 Wilhelmine of Bayreuth (1709–1758)
 Mlle Guédon de Presles (early 18th century–1754)
 Barbara of Portugal (1711–1758)
 Luise Adelgunda Gottsched (1713–1762)
 Santa della Pietà (c. 1715?–after 1774) (fl. c. 1725–1750)
 Philippine Charlotte of Prussia (1716–1801)
 Mlle Duval (1718–after 1775)
 Elisabeth de Haulteterre (c. 1720?–after 1768) (fl. 1737–1768)
 Agata Della Pietà (c. 1720?–?) (fl. c. 1800)
 Maria Teresa Agnesi (1720–1795)
 Anna Amalia of Prussia (1723–1787)
 Maria Antonia of Bavaria (1724–1780)
 Diamante Medaglia Faini (1724–1770)
 Miss Davis (c. 1726–after 1755)
 Elisabetta de Gambarini (1731–1765)
 Josina van Aerssen (Baroness Boetzelaer) (1733–1787)
 Mme Papavoine (born c. 1735, fl. 1755–61)
 Hélène-Louise Demars (b. c. 1736)
 Anna Bon (born 1738–1739)
 Anna Amalia, Duchess of Saxe-Weimar-Eisenach (1739–1807)
 Mlle Guerin (born c. 1739, fl. 1755)
 Isabelle de Charrière (Belle van Zuylen) (1740–1805)
 Elisabeth Olin (1740–1828)
 Maria Carolina Wolf (1742–1820)
 Anne Louise Brillon de Jouy, née Boyvin d'Hardancourt (1744–1824)
 Marianna von Martines (1744–1812)
 Maddalena Laura Sirmen (1745–1818)
 Marie Emmanuelle Bayon Louis (1746–1825)
 Genovieffa Ravissa de Turin (1745/50–1807)
 Henriette Adélaïde Villard de Beaumesnil (1748–1813)
 Gertrud Elisabeth Mara (1749–1833)
 Polly Young, or Maria Barthélemon (1749–1799)
 Elizabeth Anspach (1750–1828)
 Elizabeth Joanetta Catherine von Hagen (1750–1809–10)

1751–1800

 Maria Anna Mozart (1751–1829) 
 Corona Elisabeth Wilhelmine Schröter (1751–1802)
 Juliane Reichardt (Juliane Benda) (1752–1783)
 Jane Savage (1752/3–1824)
 Jeanne Renee de Bombelles (1753–1828)
 Charlotte von Brandenstein (1754–1813)
 Josepha Duschek (1754–1824)
 Maria Theresia Ahlefeldt (1755–1810)
 Mary Linwood (1755/6–1845)
 Francesca Lebrun (1756–1791)
 Georgiana Cavendish, Duchess of Devonshire (1757–1806)
 Charlotte Caroline Wilhelmine Bachmann (1757–1817)
 Harriett Abrams (1758–1821)
 Josepha Barbara Auernhammer (1758–1820)
 Marianna von Auenbrugger (1759–1782)
 Maria Rosa Coccia (1759–1833)
 Maria Theresia von Paradis (1759–1824)
 Sophia Maria Westenholz (1759–1838)
 Christina Charlotta Cederström (1760–1832)
 Katerina Maier (c. 1760–after 1800)
 Maria Hester Park, (1760–1813)
 Marie-Elizabeth Cléry (1759–1809)
 Dorothea Jordan (1761–1816)
 Yekaterina Sinyavina (1761–1784)
 Adelheid Maria Eichner (1762–1787)
 Jane Mary Guest (c. 1762–1846)
 Ann Valentine (1762–1842)
 Anna Maria Crouch (1763–1805)
 Helene de Montgeroult (1764–1836)
 Charlotte Wilhelmina Franziska Brandes (1765–1788)
 Elizabeth Billington (1765–1818)
 Jeanne-Hippolyte Devismes (1765–?1834)
 Magdalene Stirling (1765–1846)
 Anne-Marie Krumpholtz (1766–1813)
 Harriet Wainwright (c. 1766–1843)
 Caroline Wuiet (1766–1835)
 Cecilia Maria Barthélemon (1767–1859)
 Julie Candeille (1767–1834)
 Margarethe Danzi (1768–1800)
 Maria Theresa Bland (c. 1769–1838)
 Kateřina Veronika Anna Dusíkova (1769–1833)
 Nannette Streicher (1769–1833)
 Vincenta Da Ponte (fl. second half 18th century)
 Marianne Sessi (177?–1847)
 Klementyna Grabowska (Countess Clementine) (1771–1831)
 Lucile Grétry (1772–1790)
 Maria Frances Parke (1772–1822)
 Sophie Bawr (1773–1860)
 Maria Brizzi Giorgi (1775–1822)
 Sophia Corri Dussek (1775–1847)
 Margaret Essex (1775–1807)
 Sophie Gail (1775–1819)
 Wilhelmine von Troschke und Rosenwehrt (1775–1830)
 Sophie Gay (1776–1852)
 Mme. Tarbé des Sablons (1777–1855)
 Pauline Duchambge (1778–1858)
 Louise Reichardt (1779–1826)
 Ekaterina Likoshin (fl. 1800–1810)
 Sophie Lebrun (1781–1863)
 Charlotta Seuerling (1782–1828)
 Hortense de Beauharnais (1783–1837)
 Henriette Löfman (1784–1836)
 Therese Emilie Henriette Winkel (1784–1867)
 Bettina von Arnim (Bettina Brentano) (1785–1859)
 Catherina Cibbini-Kozeluch (1785–1858)
 Isabella Colbran (1785–1845)
 Fanny Krumpholtz Pittar (1785–1815)
 Marie Bigot (1786–1820)
 Caroline Boissier-Butini (1786–1836)
 Le Sénéchal de Kerkado (c. 1786–after 1805)
 Wilhelmine Schwertzell (1787–1863)
 Elena Asachi (1789–1877)
 Maria Agata Szymanowska (1789–1831)
 Harriet Browne (1790–1858)
 Elise Schlick (1790–1855)
 Gertrude van den Bergh (1793–1840)
 Amalie, Princess of Saxony (1794–1870)
 Olivia Buckley (born mid-1790s–after 1845)
 Mme Delaval (fl. 1791–1802)
 Hedda Wrangel (1792–1833)
 Caroline Ridderstolpe (1793–1878)
 Helene Liebmann (1796–1835)
 Mathilda d'Orozco (1796–1863)
 Emilie Zumsteeg (1796–1857)
 Annette von Droste-Hülshoff (1797–1848)
 Virginie Morel-du Verger (1799–1869)
 Maria Fredrica von Stedingk (1799–1868)
 Filipina Brzezińska-Szymanowska (1800–1886)
 Susanna Nerantzi (fl. 1830–1840)

1801–1850

 Marianna Bottini (1802–1858)
 Marion Dix Sullivan (1802–1860)
 Eliza Flower (1803–1846)
 Anna Sick (1803–1895)
 Isidora Zegers (1803–1869)
 Louise Farrenc (1804–1875)
 Louise Bertin (1805–1877)
 Fanny Mendelssohn (1805–1847)
 Elizabeth Masson (1806–1865)
 Adelaide Orsola Appignani (1807–1884)
 Helen Blackwood (1807–1867)
 Emma Hartmann (1807–1851)
 H. Servier (1807–1858)
 Princess Cecilia of Sweden (1807–1844)
 Caroline Wiseneder (1807–1868)
 Maria Malibran (1808–1836)
 Caroline Elizabeth Sarah Norton (1808–1877)
 Anna Caroline Oury (1808–1880)
 Leopoldine Blahetka (1809–1885)
 Hanna Brooman (1809–1887)
 Baronne Almaury de Maistre (1809–1875)
 Johanna Kinkel (1810–1858)
 Louise Geneviève de Le Hye (1810–1838)
 Loïsa Puget (1810–1889)
 Elise Schmezer (1810–1856)
 Alicia Ann Scott (1810–1900)
 Josefa Somellera (1810–1885)
 Carolina Uccelli (1810–1885)
 Ann Mounsey (1811–1891)
 Emilie Mayer (1812–1883)
 Amalia Redec (1812–1885)
 Sophie Seipt (1812–1889)
 Julie von Webenau née Baroni-Cavalcabò (1813–1887)
 Delphine von Schauroth (1814–1887)
 Thérèse Wartel (1814–1865)
 Fredrikke Egeberg (1815–1861)
 Josephine Lang (1815–1880)
 Mary Anne à Beckett (1817–1863)
 Harriet Anne Smart (1817–1883)
 Caroline Orger (1818–1892)
 Caroline Reinagle (1818–1892)
 Ellen Dickson (1819–1878)
 Clara Schumann (1819–1896)
 Elizabeth Stirling (1819–1895)
 Augusta Browne (1820–1882)
 Felicita Casella (c. 1820–after 1865)
 Emilie Hammarskjöld (1821–1854)
 Clara Angela Macirone (1821–1895)
 Charlotte Sainton-Dolby (1821–1885)
 Maria Anna Stubenberg (1821–1912)
 Pauline Viardot (1821–1910)
 Betty Boije (1822–1854)
 Faustina Hasse Hodges (1822–1895)
 Hermine Rudersdorff (1822–1882)
 Amalie Scholl (1823–1879)
 Louise Strantz (1823–1909)
 Maria Vespermann (1823–1882)
 Emma Maria Macfarren (1824–1895)
 Marie Siegling (1824–1919)
 Jane Sloman (1824–after 1850)
 Virginia Gabriel (1825–1877)
 Kate Loder (1825–1904)
 Nina Stollewerk (1825–1914)
 Maria Lindsay (1827–1898)
 Teresa Milanollo (1827–1904)
 Julia Niewiarowska-Brzozowska (1827–1891)
 Elizabeth Philp (1827–1885)
 Clémence de Grandval (1828–1907)
 Ellen R. Thompson (1928–2014)
 Anna Schuppe (1829–1903)
 Charlotte Alington Barnard (1830–1869)
 Charlotte Tardieu (1829–1890)
 Aurore von Haxthausen (1830–1888)
 Fanny Arthur Robinson (1831–1879)
 Martha von Sabinin (1831–1892)
 Julia Woolf (1831–1893)
 Modesta Sanginés Uriarte (1832–1887)
 Mathilde Hannah von Rothschild (1832–1924)
 Sophia Dellaporta (fl. second half of the 19th century)
 Clotilde Kainerstorfer (1833–1897)
 Kate Lucy Ward (1833–1915)
 Esmeralda Athanasiu-Gardeev (1834–1917)
 Tekla Bądarzewska-Baranowska (1834–1861)
 Teckla Juel (1834–1904)
 Anna Pessiak-Schmerling (1834–1896)
 Helen Tretbar (1835–1902)
 Johanne Amelie Fenger (1836–1913)
 Susan McFarland Parkhurst (1836–1918)
 Anaïs Perrière-Pilte (1836–1878)
 Constance Faunt Le Roy Runcie (1836–1911)
 Charlotte Sporleder (1836–1915)
 Pauline Thys (c.1836–1909)
 Caroline Wichern (1836–1906)
 Carlotta Ferrari (1837–1907)
 Bertha Tammelin (1836–1915)
 Georgina Weldon (1837–1914)
 Harriet Maitland Young (1838–1923)
 Liliʻuokalani (1838–1917)
 Louise Haenel de Cronenthall (1839–c. 1876)
 Lotten Edholm (1839–1930)
 Laura Constance Netzel (1839–1927)
 Alice Mary Smith (1839–1884)
 Ingeborg von Bronsart (1840–1913)
 Theodora Cormontan (1840–1922)
 Georgina Schubert (1840–1878)
 Mary Helena Synge (1840–1917)
 Elfrida Andrée (1841–1929)
 Clara H. Scott (1841–1897)
 Louise Héritte-Viardot (1841–1918)
 Julie Waldburg-Wurzach (1841–1914)
 Josefina Brdlíková (1843–1910)
 Florence Ashton Marshall (1843–1922)
 Oliveria Louisa Prescott (1843–1919)
 Manuela Antonia Márquez García-Saavedra (1844–1890)
 Marguerite Olagnier (1844–1906)
 Clara Kathleen Rogers (1844–1931)
 Ika Peyron (1845–1922)
 Giuseppina Vitali (1845–1915)
 Regina Watson (1845–1913)
 Ella Adayevskaya (née Schultz) (1846–1926)
 Marie Jaëll (1846–1925)
 Sophie Menter (1846–1918)
 Valentina Serova (1846–1924)
 Agnes Tyrrell (1846–1883)
 Antonietta Gambara Untersteiner (1846–1896)
 Eliza Mazzucato Young (1846–1937)
 Eloísa D'Herbil (1847–1943)
 Agathe Backer Grøndahl (1847–1907)
 Chiquinha Gonzaga (1847–1935)
 Augusta Holmès (1847–1903)
 Agnes Zimmermann (1847–1925)
 Josephine Amann-Weinlich (1848–1887)
 Nadezhda Rimskaya-Korsakova (1848–1919)
 Teresa Seneke (1848–1875)
 Frances Allitsen (1849–1912)
 Soledad Bengoecha de Cármena (1849–1893)
 Catalina Berroa (1849–1911)
 Roberta Geddes-Harvey (1849–1930)
 Ludmila Jeske-Choińska-Mikorska (1849–1898)
 Nanna Magdalene Liebmann (1849–1935)
 Felicia Tuczek (1849–1905)
 Pauline Volkstein (1849–1925)
 Stephanie Wurmbrand-Stuppach (1849–1919)
 Luise Adolpha Le Beau (1850–1927)
 Carrie Burpee Shaw (1850–1946)
 Kate Simmons (1850–1926)
 Emma Roberto Steiner (1850–1928)

1851–1875

 Maria Wilhelmj (185?–1930)
 Mary Grant Carmichael (1851–1935)
 Gabrielle Ferrari (1851–1921)
 Annie Fortescue Harrison (1851–1944)
 Kate Vanderpoel (born 1851)
 Helena Munktell (1852–1919)
 Marie Townsend (1851–1912)
 Antha Minerva Virgil (c. 1852–1939)
 Amanda Röntgen-Maier (1853–1894)
 Teresa Carreño (1853–1917)
 Susan Trew (born 1853)
 Josephine Troup (1853–1912)
 Mary Augusta Wakefield (1853–1910)
 Julie Rivé-King (1854–1937)
 Hendrika van Tussenbroek (1854–1935)
 Nellie Bangs Skelton (1855–1911)
 Maude Valérie White (1855–1937)
 Cecilia Arizti (1856–1930)
 Eva Dell'Acqua (1856–1930)
 Kateřina Emingerová (1856–1934)
 Helen Hopekirk (1856–1945)
 Natalia Janotha (1856–1932)
 Gilda Ruta (1856–1932)
 Mary Elizabeth Turner Salter (1856–1938)
 Fannie Lovering Skinner (1856–1938)
 Berta Bock (1857–1945)
 Cécile Chaminade (1857–1944)
 Rosalind Frances Ellicott (1857–1924)
 Ethel R. Harraden (1857–1917)
 Mathilde Kralik von Mayerswalden (1857–1944)
 Mary Knight Wood (1857–1944)
 Emma Wooge (1857–1935)
 Emma Mundella (1858–1896)
 Carrie B. Wilson Adams (1858–1940)
 Mélanie Bonis (1858–1937)
 Catharina van Rennes (1858–1940)
 Guy d'Hardelot (1858–1936)
 Hilda Sehested (1858–1936)
 Ethel Smyth (1858–1944)
 Stella Stocker (1858–1925)
 Lydia Kunz Venth (1858–1931)
 Adelheid Wette (1858–1916)
 Sophie Wolff-Fritz (1858–1938)
 Hedwige Chrétien (1859–1944)
 Laura Sedgwick Collins (1859–1927)
 Narcisa Freixas (1859–1926)
 Vincenza Garelli della Morea (1859–after 1924)
 Susie Frances Harrison (1859–1935)
 Elisabeth Meyer (1859–1927)
 Ida Georgina Moberg (1859–1947)
 Margit Sztaray (1859–?)
 Teresa Tanco Cordovez de Herrera (1859–1946)
 Bertha Tapper (1859–1915)
 Hope Temple (1859–1938)
 Agnes Tschetschulin (1859–1942)
 Ellen Wright (1859–1904)
 Laura Valborg Aulin (1860–1928)
 Alicia Van Buren (1860–1922)
 Celeste de Longpré Heckscher (1860–1928)
 Halina Krzyżanowska (1860–1937)
 Ella May Dunning Smith (1860–1934)
 Isabel Stewart North (1860–1929)
 Hilda Wilson (1860–1918)
 Amy Woodforde-Finden (1860–1919)
 Mary J. A. Wurm (1860–1938)
 Florence Everilda Goodeve (1861–1915)
 Erika Stang (1861–1898)
 Anna Teichmüller (1861–1940)
 Florence Aylward (1862–1950)
 Carrie Bond (1862–1946)
 Dora Bright (1862–1951)
 Liza Lehmann (1862–1918)
 Adela Maddison (1862–1929)
 Mona McBurney (1862–1932)
 Edith Swepstone (1862–1930)
 Marian Arkwright (1863–1922)
 Luisa Casagemas (1863–after 1894)
 Maria Chefaliady-Taban (1863–1932)
 Abbie Gerrish-Jones (1863–1929)
 Helen Francis Hood (1863–1949)
 Izabella Kuliffay (1863–1945)
 Alicia Adélaide Needham (1863–1945)
 Cornélie van Oosterzee (1863–1943)
 Caroline Holme Walker (1863–1955)
 Elisabeth Wintzer (1863–1933)
 Florence Maude Ewart (1864–1949)
 Eleanor Everest Freer (1864–1942)
 Alice Tegnér (1864–1943)
 Borghild Holmsen (1865–1938)
 Lillian Tait Sheldon (1865–1925)
 Fannie Morris Spencer (1865–1943)
 Amanda Ira Aldridge (1866–1956)
 Henriette van den Boorn-Coclet (1866–1945)
 Clara Anna Korn (1866–1941)
 Laura Lemon (1866–1924)
 Alice Sauvrezis (1866–1946)
 Tekla Griebel Wandall (1866–1940)
 Mary Louisa White (1866–1935)
 Amy Beach (1867–1944)
 Margherita Galeotti (1867–after 1912)
 Amy Elsie Horrocks (1867–after 1915)
 Margaret Ruthven Lang (1867–1972)
 Alexandra Thomson (1867–1907)
 Gisella Delle Grazie (born 1868, fl. 1894–95)
 Signe Lund (1868–1950)
 Annie Patterson (1868–1934)
 Anna Diller Starbuck (1868–1929)
 Joséphine Boulay (1869–1925)
 Virginia Mariani Campolieti (1869–1941)
 Maria Antonietta Picconi (1869–1926)
 Caro Roma (1869–1937)
 Patty Stair (1869–1926)
 Else Streit (1869–?)
 Therese Wittman (1869–1942)
 Grace Chadbourne (1870–1919)
 Eugénie-Emilie Juliette Folville (1870–1946)
 Mon Schjelderup (1870–1934)
 Pauline B. Story (1870–1952)
 Pamela Motley Verrall (1870–1948)
 Lola Carrier Worrell (1870–1929)
 Hélène-Frédérique de Faye-Jozin (1871–1942) (name often abbreviated as Fréd. de Faye-Jozin)
 Nellie von Gerichten Smith (1871–1952)
 Anita Socola Specht (1871–1958)
 Florence Turner-Maley (1871–1962)
 Jane Vieu (1871–1955)
 Bessie Marshall Whitely (1871–1944)
 Louise Tunison (1872–1899)
 Leokadiya Kashperova (1872–1940)
 Clara Mathilda Faisst (1872–1948)
 Mabel Madison Watson (1872–1952)
 Annette Thoma (1872–1959)
 Eliza Woods (1872–1961)
 María de las Mercedes Adam de Aróstegui (1873–1957)
 Elise Fellows White (1873–1953)
 Ethel Barns (1874–1948)
 Frances Tarbox (1874–1959)
 Josephine Trott (1874–1950)
 Anna Cramer (1873–1968)
 Celeste Jaguaribe de Matos Celeste (1873–1938)
 Emma Lomax (1873–1963)
 Mary Carr Moore (1873–1957)
 Anice Potter Terhune (1873–1964)
 Maude Nugent (1873/4–1958)
 Katharine Emily Eggar (1874–1961)
 Lena Stein-Schneider (1874–1958)
 Elsa Swartz (1874–1948)
 Bertha Frensel Wegener (1874–1953)
 Rosalie Balmer Smith Cale (1875–1958)
 Adele Bloesch-Stöcker (1875–1978)
 Irène Fuerison (1875–1931)
 Katharine Lucke (1875–1962)
 Henriette Renié (1875–1956)
 Erna Schorlemmer (1875–1945)
 Satella Waterstone (1875–1938)
 Vilma von Webenau (1875–1953)
 Sara Wennerberg-Reuter (1875–1959)

1876–1900 

 Lucia Contini Anselmi (1876–after 1913)
 Madelene Van Aardt (1896–1982)
 Hélène Fleury-Roy (1876–1957)
 Armande de Polignac (1876–1962)
 Teresa Clotilde del Riego (1876–1968)
 Jean E. Williams (1876–1965)
 Addie Anderson Wilson (1876–1966)
 Elsa Laura Wolzogen (1876–1945)
 Mabel Wheeler Daniels (1877–1971)
 Elisabeth Kuyper (1877–1953)
 Anna Schytte (1877–1953)
 Anna Suszczynska (1877–1931)
 Jeanne Beijerman-Walraven (1878–1969)
 Eugenia Calosso (1878–1914)
 Johanna Müller-Hermann (1878–1941)
 Hope Squire (1878–1936)
 Yuliya Veysberg (1878/1880–1942)
 Wanda Landowska (1879–1959)
 Magdeleine Boucherit Le Faure (1879–1960)
 Carmela Mackenna (1879–1962)
 Alma Mahler (1879–1964)
 Poldowski (1879–1932)
 Johanna Senfter (1879–1961)
 Louise Siddall (1879–1935)
 Nannie Louise Wright (1879–1958)
 Ethel Scarborough (1880–1956)
 Elena Stanekaite-Laumyanskene (1880–1960)
 Geertruida van Vladeracken (1880–1947)
 Florence Wickham (1880–1962)
 Gena Branscombe (1881–1977)
 Reine Colaço Osorio-Swaab (1881–1971)
 Nancy Dalberg (1881–1949)
 Fannie Charles Dillon (1881–1974)
 Cecile Paul Simon (1881–1970)
 Marion Bauer (1882–1955)
 Mary Howe (1882–1964)
 Verdi Karns (1882–1925)
 Ernestina Lecuona y Casado (1882–1951)
 Mary Lucas (1882–1952)
 Adaline Shepherd (1883–1950)
 Eva Ruth Spalding (1883–1969)
 Dina Appeldoorn (1884–1938)
 Marguerite Béclard d'Harcourt (1884–1964)
 May Brahe (1884–1956)
 Nora Holt (1884–1974)
 Giulia Recli (1884–1970)
 Gisela Selden-Goth (1884–1975)
 Blanche Selva (1884–1942)
 Maria Elizabeth van Ebbenhorst Tengbergen (1885–1980)
 María Grever (1885–1951)
 Eva Jessye (1885–1992)
 Mana Zucca (1885–1981)
 Dora Pejačević (1885–1923)
 Frieda Schmitt-Lermann (born 1885)
 Louise Cooper Spindle (1885–1968)
 J. Lilian Vandevere (1885–1957)
 Edith Weiss-Mann (1885–1851)
 Giovanna Bruna Baldacci (1886–after 1910)
 Christabel Baxendale (1886–after 1951)
 Rebecca Helferich Clarke (1886–1979)
 Ellen Coleman (1886–1973)
 Elizabeth Gyring (1886–1970)
 Ethel Leginska (1886–1970)
 Margaret McClure Stitt (1886–1979)
 Herma Studeny (1886–1973)
 Annette Thoma (1886–1974)
 Leonie Tonel (died 1886)
 Nadia Boulanger (1887–1979)
 Mildred Couper (1887–1974)
 Clara Edwards (1887–1974)
 Emilia Gubitosi (1887–1972)
 Florence Beatrice Price (1887–1953)
 Meta Schumann (1887–1937)
 Margarete Schweikert (1887–1957)
 Anne Stratton (1887–1977)
 Lily Strickland (1887–1958)
 Bertha Tideman-Wijers (1887–1976)
 Bertha Weber (1887–1961)
 May Aufderheide (1888–1972)
 Carmen Barradas (1888–1963)
 Johanna Beyer (1888–1944)
 Ilse Fromm-Michaels (1888–1986)
 Anna Maria Klechniowska (1888–1973)
 Julie Reisserová (1888–1938)
 Maria Rodrigo (1888–1967)
 Elna Sherman (1888–1964)
 Lyubov Streicher (1888–1958)
 Jeanette Tillett (1888–1965)
 Rosy Wertheim (1888–1949)
 Gertrude Hoag Wilson (1888–1968)
 Amy Aldrich Worth (1888–1967)
 Emiliana de Zubeldia (1888–1987)
 Ina Boyle (1889–1967)
 Ethel Glenn Hier (1889–1971)
 Eleni Lambiri (1889–1960)
 Luise Schulze-Berghof (1889–1970)
 Elsa Stuart-Bergstrom (1889–1970)
 Celia Torrá (1889–1962)
 Hanna Vollenhoven (1889–1972)
 Vally Weigl (1889–1982)
 Helen Searles Westbrook (1889–1967)
 E. Florence Whitlock (1889–1978)
 Lydia Boucher (1890–1971)
 Marguerite Canal (1890–1978)
 Evelyn Faltis (1890–1937)
 Pauline Hall (1890–1969)
 Grace LeBoy (1890–1983)
 Kathleen Lockhart Manning (1890–1951)
 Eda Rapoport (1890–1968)
 Sara Opal Search (1890–1961)
 Alice Marion Shaw (born 1890)
 Margaret Hoberg Turrell (1890–1948)
 Frida Kern (1891–1988)
 Florentina Mallá (1891–1973)
 Morfydd Llwyn Owen (1891–1918)
 Tamara Antonovna Shaverzashvili (1891–1955)
 Catherine Murphy Urner (1891–1942)
 Frances Turgeon Wiggin (1891–1985)
 Johanna Bordewijk-Roepman (1892–1971)
 Katherine K. Davis (1892–1980)
 Mirrie Hill (1892–1986)
 Maria Scheepers (1892–1989)
 Louise E. Stairs (1892–1975)
 Germaine Tailleferre (1892–1983)
 Anne Upton (1892–1970)
 Ella May Walker (1892–1960)
 Mildred Weston (1892–1975)
 Helen Wing (1892–1981)
 Margareta Xenopol (1892–1979)
 Lili Boulanger (1893–1918)
 Marta Canales (1893–1986)
 Dorothy Gow (1893–1982)
 Helen Eugenia Hagan (1893–1964)
 Amy Upham Thomson McKean (1893–1972)
 Philippine Schick (1893–1970)
 Theodora Troendle (1893–1972)
 Tamara Vakhvakhishvili (1893–1976)
 Kalitha Dorothy Fox (1894–1934)
 Jane M. Joseph (1894–1929)
 Elsa Respighi (1894–1996)
 Mildred Souers (1894–1977)
 Helen Steele (born 1894)
 Viola Van Katwijk (1894–1980)
 Awilda Villarini (1894–1989)
 Sláva Vorlová (1894–1973)
 Henriëtte Bosmans (1895–1952)
 Kathleen Dale (1895–1984)
 Kathleen Richards (1895–1984)
 Esther Cox Todd (1895–1971)
 Mildred Lund Tyson (1895–1989)
 Vera Vinogradova (1895–1982)
 Maria Bach (1896–1978)
 Shirley Graham Du Bois (1896–1977)
 María Teresa Prieto (1896–1982)
 Anna Renfer (1896–1984)
 María Luisa Sepúlveda (1896–1958)
 Lucie Vellère (1896–1966)
 Rossini Vrionides (1896–1943)
 Benna Moe (1897–1983)
 Margaret Sutherland (1897–1984)
 Muriel Emily Herbert (1897–1984)
 Kay Swift (1897–1993)
 Ruth Tripp (1897–1971)
 Mildred Cozzens Turner (1897–1992)
 Kathe Volkart-Schlager (1897–1976)
 Dorothy Wanderman (1897–1988)
 Mimi Wagensonner (1897–1970)
 Barbara Giuranna (1898–1998)
 Dorothy Howell (1898–1982)
 Grace Vamos (1898–1992)
 Stefania Turkewich (1998–1977)
 Jeanne Leleu (1898–1979)
 Svea Nordblad Welander (1898–1985)
 Glad Robinson Youse (1898–1985)
 Mansi Barberis (1899–1986)
 Radie Britain (1899–1994)
 Marcelle de Manziarly (1899–1989)
 Lili Wieruszowski (1899–1971)
 Edith Wire (1899–1973)
 Grete von Zieritz (1899–2001)
 Carmelina Delfin (c. 1900–after 1948)

1900s

 Lola Castegnaro (1900–1979)
 Florence Margaret Spencer Palmer (1900–1987)
 Gladys Marie Stein (1900–1989)
 Zdenka Ticharich (1900–1979)
 Elinor Remick Warren (1900–1991)
 Gertrude Price Wollner (1900–1985)
 Lotte Backes (1901–1990)
 Ruth Crawford Seeger (1901–1953)
 Sophie Carmen Eckhardt-Gramatté (1901–1974)
 Dorothy James (1901–1982)
 Else Schmitz-Gohr (1901–1987)
 Emmy Wegener (1901–1973)
 Hedy Frank-Autheried (1902–1979)
 Lūcija Garūta (1902–1977)
 Helvi Leiviskä (1902–1982)
 Doris Gertrude Sheppard (1902–1982)
 Irene Skovgaard (1902–1982)
 Freda Swain (1902–1985)
 Rose Thisse-Derouette (1902–1989)
 Pava Turtygina (1902–1985)
 Claude Arrieu (1903–1990)
 Helza Cameu (1903–1995)
 María Enma Botet Dubois (1903–?)
 Rhoda Coghill (1903–2000)
 Avril Coleridge-Taylor (1903–1998)
 Lillian Fuchs (1903–1991)
 Jessie Furze (1903–1984)
 Marianne Gary-Schaffhauser (1903–1992)
 Ivy Priaulx Rainier (1903–1986)
 Miriam Shatal (1903–1983)
 Joanídia Sodré (1903–1975)
 Iet Stants (1903–1968)
 Heidi Sundblad-Halme (1903–1973)
 June Weybright (1903–1996)
 Maria Semyonovna Zavalishina (born 1903)
 Martha Alter (1904–1976)
 Dinorá de Carvalho (1904–1980)
 Undine Smith Moore (1904–1989)
 Lita Spena (1904–1989)
 Dorothy Parke (1904–1990)
 Esther Rofe (1904–2000)
 Anne Terrier Laffaille (1904–1971)
 Mary Wiggins (1904–1974)
 Margaret Wigham (1904–1972)
 Stefania Anatolyevna Zaranek (1904–1972)
 Andrée Bonhomme (1905–1982)
 Ulric Cole (1905–1992)
 Elizabeth Poston (1905–1987)
 Verdina Shlonsky (1905–1990)
 Constance Cochnower Virtue (1905–1992)
 Shuxian Xiao (1905–1991)
 Claire Delbos (1906–1959)
 Miriam Gideon (1906–1996)
 Zara Levina (1906–1976)
 Elisabeth Lutyens (1906–1983)
 Berta Alves de Sousa (1906–1997)
 Louise Talma (1906–1996)
 Elinor Meissner Traeger (1906–1983)
 Clara Wildschut (1906–1950)
 Grace Williams (1906–1977)
 Ludmila Anatolievna Yaroshevskaya (1906–1975)
 Esther Zweig (1906–1981)
 Ann Ronell (1906/1908–1993)
 Lora Aborn (1907–2005)
 Yvonne Desportes (1907–1993)
 Koharik Gazarossian (1907–1967)
 Imogen Holst (1907–1984)
 Elizabeth Maconchy (1907–1994)
 Roberta Martin (1907–1969)
 Maria Teresa Pelegrí i Marimón (1907–1995)
 Hazel Volkart (1907–1985)
 Claude Porter White (1907–1975)
 Florence Wickham (1907–1991)
 Aimee Wiele (1907–1981)
 Roberta Bitgood (1908–2007)
 Jean Coulthard (1908–2000)
 Helen Glatz (1908–1996)
 Joan Mary Last (1908–2002)
 Zenobia Powell Perry (1908–2004)
 Trude Rittmann (1908–2005)
 Alice Samter (1908–2004)
 Michiko Toyama (1908–2000)
 Ida Vivado (1908–1989)
 Grażyna Bacewicz (1909–1969)
 Maria Dziewulska (1909–2006)
 Minna Keal (1909–1999)
 Ljubica Marić (1909–2003)
 Alice Streatch (1909–1999)
 Dana Suesse (1909–1987)
 Cecile Vashaw (1909–1985)
 Zinaida Petrovna Ziberova (born 1909)

1910s

 Ana Serrano Redonnet (191?–1993)
 Elsa Barraine (1910–1999)
 Lycia de Biase Bidart (1910–1990)
 Patricia Blomfield Holt (1910–2003)
 Shena Fraser (1910–1993)
 Lila Lalauni (1910–1996)
 Paule Maurice (1910–1967)
 Evelyn La Rue Pittman (1910–1992)
 Friederike Schwarz (1910–1945)
 Dagmara Slianova-Mizandari (1910–1983)
 Galina Konstantinovna Smirnova (1910–1980)
 Alliene Brandon Webb (1910–1965)
 Mary Lou Williams (1910–1981)
 Louise Yazbeck (1910–1995)
 Kikuko Kanai (1911–1986)
 Anne-Marie Ørbeck (1911–1996)
 Marina Scriabina (1911–1998)
 Julia Smith (1911–1989)
 Phyllis Tate (1911–1987)
 Margaret Jones Wiles (1911–2000)
 Ilse Gerda Wunsch (1911–2003)
 Lydia Auster (1911–1989)
 Jeanne Behrend (1912–1988)
 Peggy Glanville-Hicks (1912–1990)
 Gisela Hernández (1912–1971)
 Sirvart Karamanuk (1912–2008)
 Barbara Pentland (1912–2000)
 Irena Pfeiffer (1912–1996)
 Jadwiga Szajna-Lewandowska (1912–1994)
 Violet Archer (1913–2000)
 Isabel Aretz (1913–2005)
 Margaret Allison Bonds (1913–1972)
 Matilde Capuis (1913–2017)
 Peggy Stuart Coolidge (1913–1981)
 Sylvia Fine (1913–1991)
 Vivian Fine (1913–2000)
 Dulcie Holland (1913–2000)
 Miriam Hyde (1913–2005)
 Netty Simons (1913–1994)
 Rodica Sutzu (1913–1979)
 Jane Vignery (1913–1974)
 Esther Allan (1914–1985)
 Cacilda Borges Barbosa (1914–2010)
 Suzanne Joly (1914–2012)
 Minuetta Kessler (1914–2002)
 Teresa Rampazzi (1914–2001)
 Josée Vigneron-Ramackers (1914–2002)
 Regina Hansen Willman (1914–1965)
 Esther Ballou (1915–1973)
 Eunice Catunda (1915–1991)
 Júlia Hajdú (1915–1987)
 Pamela Harrison (1915–1990)
 Najla Jabor (1915–2001)
 Vítězslava Kaprálová (1915–1940)
 Eunice Katunda (1915–1991)
 Marjo Tal (1915–2006)
 Joan Trimble (1915–2000)
 Pamela Motley Verrall (1915–1996)
 Berthe di Vito-Delvaux (1915–2005)
 Edwina Florence Wills (1915–2002)
 Ann Wyeth McCoy (1915–2005)
 Jane Corner Young (1915–2001)
 Olga De Blanck Martín (1916–1998)
 Carin Malmlöf-Forssling (1916–2005)
 Erna Tauro (1916–1993)
 Ruth Shaw Wylie (1916–1989)
 Beatrice Witkin (1916–1990)
 Els Aarne (1917–1995)
 Joyce Howard Barrell (1917–1989)
 Clarisse Leite (1917–2003)
 Geraldine Mucha (1917–2012)
 Maj Sønstevold (1917–1996)
 Ėta Mayseyewna Tïrmand (1917–2008)
 Erna Woll (1917–2005)
 Frances Ziffer (1917–1996)
 María Matilde Alea Fernández (1918–2006)
 Lila-Gene George (1918–2017)
 Lina Pires de Campos (1918–2003)
 Gayane Č'ebotaryan (1918–1998)
 Dilys Elwyn-Edwards (1918–2012)
 Lucrecia Roces Kasilag (1918–2008)
 Matilde Salvador (1918–2007)
 Denise Tolkowsky (1918–1991)
 Jórunn Viðar (1918–2017)
 Norma Wendelburg (1918–2016)
 Yevgania Yosifovna Yakhina (1918–1983)
 Roslyn Brogue (1919–1981)
 Eleonora Eksanishvili (1919–2003)
 Ludmila Frajt (1919–1999)
 Dorothy Whitson Freed (1919–2000)
 Hilda Jerea (1919–1980)
 Tamara Maliukova Sidorenko (1919–2005)
 Qu Xixian (1919–2008)
 Galina Ustvolskaya (1919–2006)
 Constance Walton (1919–2017)

1920s

 Rolande Falcinelli (1920–2006)
 Dorothea Anne Franchi (1920–2003)
 María Teresa Oller (1920–2018)
 Nydia Pereyra-Lizaso (1920–1998)
 Hazel Ghazarian Skaggs (1920–2005)
 Janina Skowronska (1920–1992)
 Marion Vree (1920–2012)
 Helen L. Weiss (1920–1948)
 Chaya Arbel (1921–2007)
 Dorothea Austin (1921–2011)
 Adrienne Clostre (1921–2006)
 Jeanne Demessieux (1921–1968)
 Ruth Gipps (1921–1999)
 Nazife Güran (1921–1993)
 Mara Petrova (1921–1997)
 Magdalene Schauss-Flake (1921–2008)
 Alice Sirooni (1921–2011)
 Hanna Skalska-Szemioth (1921–1964)
 Rosalina Abejo (1922–1991)
 Margaret Buechner (1922–1998)
 Doreen Carwithen (1922–2003)
 Odette Gartenlaub (1922–2014)
 Ester Mägi (1922–2021)
 Sylvia Rexach (1922–1961)
 Beatrice Schroeder Rose (1922–2014)
 Jeanine Rueff (1922–1999)
 Virginia Seay (1922–2015)
 Nadezhda Simonyan (1922–1997)
 Dorothy Geneva Styles (1922–1984)
 Doris Akers (1923–1995)
 Teresa Borràs i Fornell (1923–2010)
 Madeleine Dring (1923–1977)
 Jean Eichelberger Ivey (1923–2010)
 Ursula Mamlok (1923–2016)
 Dika Newlin (1923–2006)
 Elena Romero (1923–1996)
 Maria Schüppel (1923–2011)
 Mira Sulpizi (born 1923)
 Asya Sultanova (1923–2021)
 Ludmila Ulehla (1923–2009)
 Katharine Mulky Warne (1923–2015)
 Elisabet Wentz-Janacek (1923–2014)
 Shafiga Akhundova (1924–2013)
 Leni Alexander (1924–2005)
 Jeanne Colin-De Clerck (born 1924)
 Zhivka Klinkova (1924–2002)
 Angela Morley (1924–2009)
 Krystyna Moszumańska-Nazar (1924–2009)
 Tatyana Nikolayeva (1924–1993)
 Gladys Nordenstrom (1924–2016)
 Else Marie Pade (1924–2016)
 Julia Perry (1924–1979)
 Ruth Schonthal (1924–2006)
 Jitka Snížková (1924–1989)
 Sylvia Soublette (1924–2020)
 Erzsébet Szőnyi (1924–2019)
 Tui St. George Tucker (1924–2004)
 Consuelo Velázquez (1924–2005)
 Bebe Barron (1925–2008)
 Cathy Berberian (1925–1983)
 P. Bhanumathi (1925–2005)
 Edith Borroff (1925–2019)
 Hilda Dianda (born 1925)
 Ginette Keller (1925–2010)
 Lyudmila Lyadova (1925–2021)
 Nelly Moretto (1925–1978)
 Daphne Oram (1925–2003)
 Alice Parker (born 1925)
 Amado Santos Ocampo (1925–2009)
 Jeanne Ellison Shaffer (1925–2009)
 Yolande Uyttenhove (1925–2000)
 Margaret Shelley Vance (1925–2008)
 Estelle White (1925–2011)
 Ruth White (1925–2013)
 Puchi Balseiro (1926–2007)
 Modesta Bor (1926–1998)
 Janine Charbonnier (1926–2022)
 Irina Elcheva (1926–2013)
 Zhun Huang (born 1926)
 Betsy Jolas (born 1926)
 Melinda Kistétényi (1926–1999)
 Maria de Lourdes Martins (1926–2009)
 Carmen Petra-Basacopol (born 1926)
 Claire Polin (1926–1995)
 Marga Richter (1926–2020)
 Esther Scliar (1926–1978)
 Natela Svanidze (1926–2017)
 An-Ming Wang (born 1926)
 Irina Yel'cheva (1926–2013)
 Ruth Zechlin (1926–2007)
 Valentine Yanovna Zhubinskaya (1926–2013)
 Marilyn J Ziffrin (1926–2018)
 Dolores Claman (1927–2021)
 Emma Lou Diemer (born 1927)
 Elaine Hugh-Jones (1927–2021)
 Eva Schorr (1927–2016)
 Williametta Spencer (born 1927)
 Mary Jeanne Van Appledorn (1927–2014)
 Marcelle Villin (born 1927)
 Chris Mary Francine Whittle (born 1927)
 Rolande Maxwell Young (1927–2015)
 Gaziza Zhubanova (1927–1993)
 Margrit Zimmermann (1927–2020)
 Luna Alcalay (1928–2012)
 Ruth Anderson (1928–2019)
 Betty Jackson King (1928–1994)
 Judith Dvorkin (1928–1995)
 Sarah Feigin (1928–2011)
 Beverly Grigsby (born 1928)
 Lena McLin (born 1928)
 Gladys Smuckler Moskowitz (born 1928)
 Nadežka Mosusova (born 1928)
 Thea Musgrave (born 1928)
 Adelaide Pereira da Silva (1928–2021)
 Mary McCarty Snow (1928–2012)
 Mira J. Spektor (1928–2021)
 Louise Spizizen (1928–2010)
 Arlene Buckneberg Ydstie (born 1928)
 Zlata Tkach (1928–2006)
 Toshiko Akiyoshi (born 1929)
 Nini Bulterijs (1929–1989)
 Geghuni Hovannesi Chitchian (born 1929)
 Siegrid Ernst (1929–2022)
 Micki Grant (1929–2021)
 Dina Koston (1929–2009)
 Nada Ludvig-Pečar (1929–2008)
 Lata Mangeshkar (1929–2022)
 Meena Mangeshkar (born 1931)
 Pierrette Mari (born 1929)
 Aleksandra Pakhmutova (born 1929)
 Elena Petrová (1929–2002)
 Irma Urteaga (1929–2022)
 Jeannine Vanier (born 1929)

1930s

 Yardena Alotin (1930–1994)
 Vera Baeva (1930–2017)
 Jacqueline Fontyn (born 1930)
 Joan Franks Williams (1930–2003)
 Antoinette Kirkwood (1930–2014)
 Kay Lande (1930–2022)
 Ruth Lomon (1930–2017)
 Gudrun Lund (1930–2020)
 Jana Obrovská (1930–1987)
 Betty Roe (born 1930)
 Clotilde Rosa (1930–2017)
 E. Anne Schwerdtfeger (1930–2008)
 Naomi Shemer (1930–2004)
 Ann Loomis Silsbee (1930–2003)
 Helen Camille Stanley (born 1930)
 Nancy Van de Vate (born 1930)
 Marion Verhaalen (1930–2020)
 Monica Witni (born 1930)
 Nancy Laird Chance (born 1931)
 Lucia Dlugoszewski (1931–2000)
 Felicia Donceanu (1931–2022)
 Sofia Gubaidulina (born 1931)
 Rosa Guraieb (1931–2014)
 Yüksel Koptagel (born 1931)
 Young-ja Lee (born 1931)
 Maria Dolores Malumbres (1931–2019)
 Myriam Marbe (1931–1997)
 Joyce Mekeel (1931–1997)
 Phillipa Duke Schuyler (1931–1967)
 Alida Vázquez (1931–2018)
 Elaine Barkin (1932–2023)
 Betty Beath (born 1932)
 Diana Pereira Hay (born 1932)
 Marta Jiráčková (born 1932)
 Liu Zhuang (1932–2011)
 Tera de Marez Oyens (1932–1996)
 Pauline Oliveros (1932–2016)
 Éliane Radigue (born 1932)
 Dorothy Ashby (1932–1986)
 Kilza Setti (born 1932)
 Gitta Steiner (1932–1990)
 Ruth Watson Henderson (born 1932)
 Pozzi Escot (born 1933)
 Ida Gotkovsky (born 1933)
 Elena Karastoyanova (born 1933)
 Yoko Ono (born 1933)
 Charlotte Moorman (1933–1991)
 Maria Helena Rosas Fernandes (born 1933)
 Rocio Sanz (1933–1993)
 Alicia Urreta (1933–1987)
 Tatyana Voronina (born 1933)
 Joan Dolores Wilson (born 1933)
 Huguang Xin (1933–2011)
 Norma Beecroft (born 1934)
 Nicole Lachartre (1934–1992)
 Mary Mageau (1934–2020)
 Zhanneta Lazarevna Metallidi (1934–2019)
 Teresa Procaccini (born 1934)
 Beatrice Siegrist (born 1934)
 Alicia Terzian (born 1934)
 Arlene Zallman (1934–2006)
 Zinaida Petrovna Ziberova (1934–2012)
 Thérèse Brenet (born 1935)
 Biancamaria Furgeri (born 1935)
 Helen Gifford (born 1935)
 Kazuko Hara (1935–2014)
 Enid Luff (1935–2022)
 Jacqueline Nova (1935–1975)
 Clara Sinde Ramallal (born 1935)
 Mirjana Sistek-Djordjevic (born 1935)
 Julia Stilman-Lasansky (1935–2007)
 Ivana Marburger Themmen (born 1935)
 Mary Lynn Twombly (born 1935)
 Shirley Walker (1935–2006)
 Qiang Wang (born 1935)
 Mirjana Živković (1935–2020)
 Sieglinda Ahrens (born 1936)
 Izabella Arazova (born 1936)
 Monic Cecconi-Botella (born 1936)
 Erika Radermacher (born 1936)
 Erika Fox (born 1936)
 Barbara Heller (born 1936)
 Trisutji Kamal (1936–2021)
 Sheila Mary Nelson (1936–2020)
 Jocy de Oliveira (born 1936)
 Vivian Adelberg Rudow (born 1936)
 Brunhilde Sonntag (1936–2002)
 Myra Brooks Turner (1936–2017)
 Keiko Abe (born 1937)
 Janet Beat (born 1937)
 Constança Capdeville (1937–1992)
 Delia Derbyshire (1937–2001)
 Beatriz Ferreyra (born 1937)
 Irina Odăgescu (born 1937)
 Katherine Hoover (1937–2018)
 Marta Lambertini (1937–2019)
 Claire Liddell (born 1937)
 Diana McIntosh (born 1937)
 Kikuko Masumoto (born 1937)
 Bernadetta Matuszczak (1937–2021)
 Irma Ravinale (1937–2013)
 Sharda (singer) (born 1937)
 Darinka Simic-Mitrovic (born 1937)
 Ann Southam (1937–2010)
 Inna Abramovna Zhvanetskaia (born 1937)
 Isabelle Aboulker (born 1938)
 Maryanne Amacher (1938–2009)
 Elizabeth R. Austin (born 1938)
 Carla Bley (born 1938)
 Ann Carr-Boyd (born 1938)
 Gloria Coates (born 1938)
 Piera Pistono (born 1938)
 Micheline Coulombe Saint-Marcoux (1938–1985)
 Tona Scherchen (born 1938)
 Shakhida Shaimardanova (born 1938)
 Mieko Shiomi (born 1938)
 Cornelia Tăutu (1938–2019)
 Joan Tower (born 1938)
 Betty Ann Wong (born 1938)
 Elinor Armer (born 1939)
 Wendy Carlos (born 1939)
 Marcelle Deschênes (born 1939)
 Lesya Dychko (born 1939)
 Maija Einfelde (born 1939)
 Jennifer Fowler (born 1939)
 Barbara Kolb (born 1939)
 Annea Lockwood (born 1939)
 María Luisa Ozaita (1939–2017)
 Katherine Teck (born 1939)
 Inger Wikström (born 1939)
 Margaret Lucy Wilkins (born 1939)
 Ellen Taaffe Zwilich (born 1939)

1940s

 Heidi Baader-Nobs (born 1940)
 Margaret Brouwer (born 1940)
 Graciela Castillo (born 1940)
 Eleanor Hovda (1940–2009)
 Maria Teresa Luengo (born 1940)
 Dorothy Rudd Moore (1940–2022)
 Graciela Paraskevaidis (1940–2017)
 Chitra Singh (born 1940)
 Awilda Villarini (born 1940)
 Eleni Karaindrou (born 1941)
 Judith Margaret Bailey (born 1941)
 Anđelka Bego-Šimunić (born 1941)
 Kay Gardner (1941–2002)
 Sorrel Hays (1941–2020)
 Moya Henderson (born 1941)
 Viera Janárčeková (born 1941)
 Usha Khanna (born 1941)
 Edith Lejet (born 1941)
 Ivana Loudová (1941–2017)
 Jenny Helen McLeod (born 1941)
 Sook-Ja Oh (born 1941)
 Terry Winter Owens (1941–2007)
 Ferdousi Rahman (born 1941)
 Magaly Ruiz Lastres (born 1941)
 Dorothy Strutt (born 1941)
 Elizabeth Walton Vercoe (born 1941)
 Gillian Whitehead (born 1941)
 Birgitte Alsted (born 1942)
 Silvana Di Lotti (born 1942)
 Canary Burton (born 1942)
 Helen Fisher (born 1942)
 Priscilla McLean (born 1942)
 Haruna Miyake (born 1942)
 Meredith Monk (born 1942)
 Kyungsun Suh (born 1942)
 Diane Thome (born 1942)
 Solange Ancona (born 1943)
 Christine Berl (born 1943)
 Michèle Bokanowski (born 1943)
 Joanna Bruzdowicz (1943–2021)
 Laura Clayton (born 1943)
 Eleanor Cory (born 1943)
 Margriet Ehlen (born 1943)
 Judy Klein (born 1943)
 Anne Lauber (born 1943)
 Tania León (born 1943)
 Marta Ptaszynska (born 1943)
 Michèle Reverdy (born 1943)
 Alice Shields (born 1943)
 Elżbieta Sikora (born 1943)
 Pril Smiley (born 1943)
 Iwonka Bogumila Szymanska (born 1943)
 Françoise Barrière (1944–2019)
 Alison Bauld (born 1944)
 Ana Bofill Levi (born 1944)
 Gabriella Cecchi (born 1944)
 Tatyana Chudova (1944–2021)
 Gloria González (born 1944)
 Elsa Justel (born 1944)
 Beatriz Lockhart (1944–2015)
 Gabriela Moyseowicz (born 1944)
 Claire Renard (born 1944)
 Marisa Rezende (born 1944)
 Rhian Samuel (born 1944)
 Margaret Scoville (1944–1978)
 Silvia Sommer (born 1944)
 Graciela Agudela (1945–2018)
 Maya Badian (born 1945)
 Gillian Bibby (born 1945)
 Victoria Bond (born 1945)
 Dorothy Quita Buchanan (born 1945)
 Judith Ann Clingan (born 1945)
 Melanie Ruth Daiken (1945–2016)
 Graciane Finzi (born 1945)
 Ig Henneman (born 1945)
 Nagako Konishi (born 1945)
 Chan-Hae Lee (born 1945)
 Vânia Dantas Leite (1945–2018)
 Younghi Pagh-Paan (born 1945)
 Maggi Payne (born 1945)
 Elizabeth Raum (born 1945)
 Carol Sams (born 1945)
 Marielli Sfakianaki (born 1945)
 Laurie Spiegel (born 1945)
 Toyoko Takami (born 1945)
 Julia Usher (born 1945)
 Judith Lang Zaimont (born 1945)
 Barbara Benary (1946–2019)
 Renate Birnstein (born 1946)
 Anne Boyd (born 1946)
 Geneviève Calame (1946–1993)
 Suzanne Ciani (born 1946)
 Dora Draganova (born 1946)
 Tsippi Fleischer (born 1946)
 Janice Giteck (born 1946)
 Ann-Elise Hannikainen (1946–2012)
 Barbara Harbach (born 1946)
 Ho Wai-On (born 1946)
 Neva Krasteva (born 1946)
 Joyce Solomon Moorman (born 1946)
 Jane O'Leary (born 1946)
 Anna Rubin (born 1946)
 Claire Schapira (born 1946)
 Daria Semegen (born 1946)
 Marilyn Shrude (born 1946)
 Sheila Silver (born 1946)
 Annette Vande Gorne (born 1946)
 Joelle Wallach (born 1946)
 Hildegard Westerkamp (born 1946)
 Barbara Maria Zakrzewska-Nikiporczyk (born 1946)
 Pınar Köksal (1946–2019)
 Liana Alexandra (1947–2011)
 Laurie Anderson (born 1947)
 Franghiz Ali-Zadeh (born 1947)
 Ruth Bakke (born 1947)
 Ada Gentile (born 1947)
 Mayako Kubo (born 1947)
 Joan La Barbara (born 1947)
 Nicola LeFanu (born 1947)
 Zarrina Mirshakar (born 1947)
 Vojna Nešić (born 1947)
 Rosica Petkova (born 1947)
 Grażyna Pstrokońska-Nawratil (born 1947)
 Faye-Ellen Silverman  (born 1947)
 Valerie Vonpechy (born 1947)
 Hilary Tann (born 1947)
 Karen Tarlow (born 1947)
 Gwyneth Van Anden Walker (born 1947)
 Susan Cohn Lackman (born 1947)
 Betty Rose Wishart (born 1947)
 Hsiung-Zee Wong (born 1947)
 Gisèle Barreau (born 1948)
 Diana Burrell (born 1948)
 Julia Cenova (1948–2010)
 Janet Graham (born 1948)
 Kerstin Jeppsson (born 1948)
 Christina Kubisch (born 1948)
 Junko Mori (born 1948)
 Ilza Nogueira (born 1948)
 Sally Johnston Reid (1948–2019)
 Shoshana Riseman (born 1948)
 Ilona Sekacz (born 1948)
 Lyudmila Karpawna Shleh (born 1948)
 Bernadette Speach (born 1948)
 Ivana Stefanović (born 1948)
 Julia Tsenova (1948–2010)
 Carol Ann Weaver (born 1948)
 Jeanne Zaidel-Rudolph (born 1948)
 Eleanor Alberga (born 1949)
 Carol E Barnett (born 1949)
 Liona Boyd (born 1949)
 Ann Callaway (born 1949)
 Rachel Galinne (born 1949)
 Alexina Louie (born 1949)
 Odaline de la Martinez (born 1949)
 Zhanna Vasil'yevna Pliyeva (born 1949)
 Shulamit Ran (born 1949)
 Angela Ro Ro (born 1949)
 Sharon Ruchman (born 1949)
 Kimi Sato (born 1949)
 Judith Shatin (born 1949)
 Marina Marta Vlad (born 1949)
 Rain Worthington (born 1949)

1950s

 Lejla Agolli (born 1950)
 Beth Anderson (born 1950)
 Édith Canat de Chizy (born 1950)
 Elena Firsova (born 1950)
 Åse Hedstrøm (born 1950)
 Yelena Sergeyevna Konshina (born 1950)
 Libby Larsen (born 1950)
 Elodie Lauten (born 1950)
 Lam Manyee (born 1950)
 Vivienne Olive (born 1950)
 Synne Skouen (born 1950)
 Nancy Telfer (born 1950)
 Anneli Arho (born 1951)
 Beatriz Bilbao (born 1951)
 Karólína Eiríksdóttir (born 1951)
 Nancy Galbraith (born 1951)
 Halina Harelava (born 1951)
 Patricia Jünger (born 1951)
 Joëlle Léandre (born 1951)
 Cecilia McDowall (born 1951)
 Liz Phillips (born 1951)
 Jeannie G. Pool (born 1951)
 Marcela Rodríguez (born 1951)
 Doina Rotaru (born 1951)
 Tat'yana Sergeyeva (born 1951)
 Elizabeth Swados (1951–2016)
 Lois V Vierk (born 1951)
 Kristi Allik (born 1952)
 Judith Bingham (born 1952)
 Helen Bowater (born 1952)
 Nicole Carignan (born 1952)
 Maya Ciobanu (born 1952)
 Tina Davidson (born 1952)
 Janet Dunbar (born 1952)
 Margriet Hoenderdos (1952–2010)
 Grażyna Krzanowska (born 1952)
 Runa Laila (born 1952)
 Bunita Marcus (born 1952)
 Alla Pavlova (born 1952)
 Kaija Saariaho (born 1952)
 Jane Sinclair Wells (born 1952)
 Lettie Alston (born 1953)
 Avril Anderson (born 1953)
 Sonja Beets (born 1953)
 Josefina Benedetti (born 1953)
 Susan Morton Blaustein (born 1953)
 Wendy Mae Chambers (born 1953)
 Chen Yi (born 1953)
 Jody Diamond (born 1953)
 Violeta Dinescu (born 1953)
 Eibhlis Farrell (born 1953)
 Adriana Hölszky (born 1953)
 Anne LeBaron (born 1953)
 Cynthia Cozette Lee (born 1953)
 Anne Linnet (born 1953)
 Cindy McTee (born 1953)
 Lidia Zielińska (born 1953)
 Sylvie Bodorová (born 1954)
 Elisabetta Brusa (born 1954)
 Judith Cloud (born 1954)
 María Escribano (born 1954)
 Susan Frykberg (born 1954)
 Juliana Hall (born 1958)
 Irina Hasnaş (born 1954)
 Birgit Havenstein (born 1954)
 Brenda Hutchinson (born 1954)
 Denise Kelly (born 1954)
 Hi Kyung Kim (born 1954)
 Renata Kunkel (born 1954)
 Bun-Ching Lam (born 1954)
 Pamela J. Marshall (born 1954)
 Ella Milch-Sheriff (born 1954)
 Betty Olivero (born 1954)
 Cecilie Ore (born 1954)
 Elizabeth Hayden Pizer (born 1954)
 Clare Shore (born 1954)
 Judith Weir (born 1954)
 Pearle Christian (born 1955)
 Eleanor Joanne Daley (born 1955)
 Susanne Erding-Swiridoff (born 1955)
 Elisenda Fabregas (born 1955)
 Diamanda Galás (born 1955)
 Gerda Geertens (born 1955)
 Anne La Berge (born 1955)
 Masguda Shamsutdinova (born 1955)
 Iryna Kyrylina (born 1955)
 Lori Laitman (born 1955)
 Marilyn Mazur (born 1955)
 Karmella Tsepkolenko (born 1955)
 Janika Vandervelde (born 1955)
 Regina Harris Baiocchi (born 1956)
 Sally Beamish (born 1956)
 Chiara Benati (born 1956)
 Eve de Castro-Robinson (born 1956)
 Deborah Drattell (born 1956)
 Anne Dudley (born 1956)
 Michelle Ekizian (born 1956)
 Madeleine Isaksson (born 1956)
 Joan Jeanrenaud (born 1956)
 Laura Kaminsky (born 1956)
 Makiko Kinoshita (born 1956)
 Larysa Kuzmenko (born 1956)
 Silvina Milstein (born 1956)
 Onutė Narbutaitė (born 1956)
 Marie Samuelsson (born 1956)
 Carla Scaletti (born 1956)
 Carolyn Steinberg (born 1956)
 Iris Szeghy (born 1956)
 Pamela Z (born 1956)
 Linda Bouchard (born 1957)
 Chaya Czernowin (born 1957)
 Ellen Fullman (born 1957)
 Regina Irman (born 1957)
 Elena Kats-Chernin (born 1957)
 Marcela Pavia (born 1957)
 Karin Rehnqvist (born 1957)
 Pan Shiji (born 1957)
 Linda Catlin Smith (born 1957)
 Joan Szymko (born 1957)
 Karen P. Thomas (born 1957)
 Melinda Wagner (born 1957)
 Janet Wheeler (born 1957)
 Eve Beglarian (born 1958)
 Maura Bosch (born 1958)
 Rhona Clarke (born 1958)
 Zulema de la Cruz (born 1958)
 Beth Denisch (born 1958)
 Consuelo Díez (born 1958)
 Suzanne Giraud (born 1958)
 Juliana Hall (born 1958)
 Hanna Havrylets' (born 1958)
 Miya Masaoka (born 1958)
 Errollyn Wallen (born 1958)
 Julia Wolfe (born 1958)
 Barbara Woof (born 1958)
 Sinta Wullur (born 1958)
 Caroline Ansink (born 1959)
 Carola Bauckholt (born 1959)
 Ilona Breģe (born 1959)
 Sussan Deyhim (born ca. 1958)
 Marti Epstein (born 1959)
 Adina Izarra (born 1959)
 Laura Karpman (born 1959)
 Ana Lara (born 1959)
 Marianella Machado (born 1959)
 Hilda Paredes (born 1959)
 Stevie Wishart (born 1959)
 Shimul Yousuf (born 1959)

1960s

 Maria de Alvear (born 1960)
 Sonia Bo (born 1960)
 Victoria Borisova-Ollas (born 1969)
 Yekaterina Chemberdzhi (born 1960)
 Andrea Clearfield (born 1960)
 Annie Gosfield (born 1960)
 Priti Paintal (born 1960)
 Jocelyn Pook (born 1960)
 Rachel Portman (born 1960)
 Maria Schneider (born 1960)
 Ute Wassermann (born 1960)
 Ana-Maria Avram (born 1961)
 Enya (born 1961)
 Unsuk Chin (born 1961)
 Julie Giroux (born 1961)
 Hanna Kulenty (born 1961)
 Michiru Oshima (born 1961)
 Janet Owen Thomas (1961–2002)
 Lourdes Perez (born 1961)
 Isabel Soveral (born 1961)
 Karen Tanaka (born 1961)
 Carolyn Yarnell (born 1961)
 Sylvia Constantinidis (born 1962)
 Mary Finsterer (born 1962)
 Jennifer Higdon (born 1962)
 Amy X Neuburg (born 1962)
 Victoria Poleva (born 1962)
 Rosephanye Powell (born 1962)
 Lolita Ritmanis (born 1962)
 Laura Schwendinger (born 1962)
 Alex Shapiro (born 1962)
 Chen Shihui (born 1962)
 Bettina Skrzypczak (born 1962)
 Allison Cameron (born 1963)
 Keiko Fujiie (born 1963)
 Joelle Khoury (born 1963)
 Veronika Krausas (born 1963)
 Sophie Lacaze (born 1963)
 Ann Millikan (born 1963)
 Isabel Mundry (born 1963)
 Halyna Ovcharenko (born 1963)
 Lucia Ronchetti (born 1963)
 Elena Ruehr (born 1963)
 Calliope Tsoupaki (born 1963)
 Hana Vejvodová (1963–1994)
 Debbie Wiseman (born 1963)
 Michiru Yamane (born 1963)
 Julia Gomelskaya (1964–2016)
 Gao Hong (born 1964)
 Yoko Kanno (born 1964)
 Eva Noer Kondrup (born 1964)
 Gabriela Ortiz (born 1964)
 Sarah Peebles (born 1964)
 Annette Schlünz (born 1964)
 Augusta Read Thomas (born 1964)
 Mariana Villanueva (born 1964)
 Diane Wittry (born 1964)
 Jennifer Margaret Barker (born 1965)
 Carin Bartosch Edström (born 1965)
 Zana Clarke (born 1965)
 Evelyn Glennie (born 1965)
 Rozalie Hirs (born 1965)
 Yuki Kajiura (born 1965)
 Sofia Levkovskaya (1965–2011)
 Albena Petrovic-Vratchanska (born 1965)
 Charlotte Seither (born 1965)
 Georgia Spiropoulos (born 1965)
 Dorothy Hindman (born 1966)
 Melissa Hui (born 1966)
 Liza Lim (born 1966)
 Gráinne Mulvey (born 1966)
 Deirdre Gribbin (born 1967)
 Yukie Nishimura (born 1967)
 Rebecca Saunders (born 1967)
 Yoko Shimomura (born 1967)
 Katia Tiutiunnik (born 1967)
 Isidora Žebeljan (1967–2020)
 Laura Andel (born 1968)
 Lisa Bielawa (born 1968)
 Kerani (born 1968)
 Vanessa Lann (born 1968)
 Elainie Lillios (born 1968)
 Sarah MacDonald (musician) (born 1968)
 Olga Neuwirth (born 1968)
 Roxanna Panufnik (born 1968)
 Ana Sokolovic (born 1968)
 Anjelika Akbar (born 1969)
 Johanna Doderer (born 1969)
 Jocelyn Morlock (born 1969)

1970s

 Siobhán Cleary (born 1970)
 Graziella Concas (born 1970)
 Marzena Komsta (born 1970)
 Chihchun Chi-sun Lee (born 1970)
 Lotta Wennäkoski (born 1970)
 Marina Leonardi (born 1970)
 Arlene Sierra (born 1970)
 Aleksandra Vrebalov (born 1970)
 Malika Kishino (born 1971)
 Soe Tjen Marching (born 1971)
 Katharina Rosenberger (born 1971)
 Ingrid Stölzel (born 1971)
 Jessica Grace Wing (1971–2003)
 Natasha Barrett (born 1972)
 Emily Doolittle (born 1972)
 Amber Ferenz (born 1972)
 Gabriela Lena Frank (born 1972)
 Hiba Kawas (born 1972)
 Analia Llugdar (born 1972)
 Deborah Lurie (born 1972)
 Nkeiru Okoye (born 1972)
 Helena Tulve (born 1972)
 Sungji Hong (born 1973)
 Lera Auerbach (born 1973)
 Jessica Curry (born 1973)
 Tansy Davies (born 1973)
 Amy Scurria (born 1973)
 Luna Pearl Woolf (born 1973)
 Selma Björnsdóttir (born 1974)
 Ellen C. Covito (born 1974)
 Meri von KleinSmid (born 1974)
 Ailís Ní Ríain (born 1974)
 Sophie Viney (born 1974)
 Jennifer Walshe (born 1974)
 Dalit Warshaw (born 1974)
 Hyo-Won Woo (born 1974)
 Kati Agócs (born 1975)
 Eugenia Manolidou (born 1975)
 Linda Martinez (1975–2005)
 Raminta Šerkšnytė (born 1975)
 Annelies Van Parys (born 1975)
 Svitlana Azarova (born 1976)
 Rita Kassabian (born 1976)
 Catherine Kontz (born 1976)
 Andrea Reinkemeyer (born 1976)
 Wang Ying (born 1976)
 Hafdís Bjarnadóttir (born 1977)
 Karola Obermueller (born 1977)
 Tanya Ekanayaka (born 1977)
 Deborah Pritchard (born 1977)
 Jennifer Thomas (pianist) (born 1977)
 Anna S. Þorvaldsdóttir (Thorvaldsdottir) (born 1977)
 Du Yun (born 1977)
 Wu Fei (born 1977)
 Kerry Andrew (born 1978)
 Justine Electra (born 1978)
 Emily Hall (born 1978)
 Vanessa-Mae (born 1978)
 Anna Meredith (born 1978)
 Agata Zubel (born 1978)
 Clarice Assad (born 1978)
 Annesley Black (born 1979)
 Emily Howard (born 1979)
 Kate Moore (born 1979)

1980s

 Abbie Betinis (born 1980)
 Anna Clyne (born 1980)
 Cheryl Frances-Hoad (born 1980)
 Wang Jie (born 1980)
 Maria Huld Markan Sigfúsdóttir (born 1980)
 Dobrinka Tabakova (born 1980)
 Missy Mazzoli (born 1980)
 Sarah Nemtsov (born 1980)
 Helen Grime (born 1981)
 Hannah Lash (born 1981)
 Angélica Negrón (born 1981)
 Charlotte Bray (born 1982)
 Hildur Guðnadóttir (born 1982)
 Natalie Ann Holt (born 1982)
 Shibani Kashyap (born 1982)
 Catherine Lamb (born 1982)
 Jessie Montgomery (born 1982)
 Caroline Shaw (born 1982)
 M. M. Srilekha (born 1982)
 Ann Cleare (born 1983)
 Reena Esmail (born 1983)
 Sneha Khanwalkar (1983)
 Sarah Hutchings (born 1984)
 Sasha Siem (born 1984)
 Cristina Spinei (born 1984)
 Dafina Zeqiri (born 1984)
 Isobel Waller-Bridge (born 1984)
 Zosha Di Castri (born 1985)
 Alissa Firsova (born 1986)
 Cevanne Horrocks-Hopayian (born 1986)
 Kathryn Salfelder (born 1987)
 Shiva Feshareki (born 1987)
 Julia Adolphe (born 1988)
 Cecilia Damström (born 1988)
 Sarah Lianne Lewis (born 1988)
 Bára Gísladóttir (born 1989)
 Elizabeth Ogonek (born 1989)
 Freya Waley-Cohen (born 1989)

1990s
Sonya Belousova (born 1990)
Anja Plaschg (born 1990)
Lucy Armstrong (born 1991)
Georgia Koumará (born 1991)
Diana Ringo (born 1992)
Dani Howard (born 1993)
Lillie Harris (born 1994)
Grace-Evangeline Mason (born 1994)

2000s
 Emily Bear (born 2001)
 Alma Deutscher (born 2005)

Unknown
 Mary McDonald (living, born in the 20th century)
 Winifred Phillips (living; born in the 20th century)
 Shirley Thompson (living; born in the 20th century)
 Yuka Tsujiyoko (living; born in the 20th century)

See also 
 List of Australian women composers
 Lists of composers
 List of 20th-century classical composers
 List of women film score composers
 Trobairitz women troubadours
 :Category:Women composers
 Women in music

Notes and references
Notes

References

Sources
 Citron, Marcia J. (1990). "Gender, Professionalism and the Musical Canon", The Journal of Musicology vol. 8, no. 1, pp. 102–117. 
List partially created using Grove's "Explore" function, Grove Music Online, ed. L. Macy (accessed 23 September 2006), grovemusic.com .

Further reading 
 
 Briscoe, James R. (ed.) (1986). Historical Anthology of Music by Women. Indiana University Press. 
 Gates, Eugene (2006). "The Woman Composer Question: Philosophical and Historical Perspectives"  Kapralova Society Journal, vol. 4, issue 2. Accessed 23 November 2020.
 Launay, Florence (2006). Les Compositrices en France au XIXe siècle. Paris: Fayard.

External links 
 International Alliance for Women in Music
 The Woman Composer Question a bibliography by Dr. Eugene Gates
 French women composers (in French)
 List of Iberoamerican and Spanish Women composers by Dr. Cecilia Piñero Gil
 "And Don't Call Them 'Lady' Composers" by Pauline Oliveros
 Historical Notes for collection of melodies by women composers
 Audio links Female Composers 19th, 20th en 21st century

Female
 
Composers
Women in music